Pierre Grenier was a politician Quebec, Canada and a Member of the Legislative Assembly of Quebec (MLA).

Early life

He was born on June 11, 1837 in Trois-Rivières, Mauricie and was a physician.

Political career

He ran as a Conservative candidate in the district of in the provincial district of Champlain in 1890 and won with the backing of local Catholic Bishop Louis-François Richer Laflèche.  He succeeded Parti National incumbent Ferdinand Trudel.

Grenier was re-elected in 1892 and 1897.

He did not run for re-election in 1900.  He was succeeded by Liberal Pierre-Calixte Neault.

Death

He died on December 23, 1903 in Champlain.

Footnotes

See also
Champlain Provincial Electoral District
Mauricie

1837 births
1903 deaths
Conservative Party of Quebec MNAs
People from Trois-Rivières